The Venus of Laussel is an  limestone bas-relief of a nude woman. It is painted with red ochre and was carved into the limestone of a rock shelter (Abri de Laussel) in the commune of Marquay, in the Dordogne department of south-western France. The carving is associated with the Gravettian Upper Paleolithic culture (approximately 25,000 years old). It is currently displayed in the Musée d'Aquitaine in Bordeaux, France.

Description
The figure holds a bison horn, or possibly a cornucopia, in one hand, which has thirteen notches. She has large breasts, a great stomach, and wide hips. There is a "Y" on her thigh and her faceless head is turned toward the horn. The lower relief was covered in red ochre.

Discovery and display
The relief was discovered in 1911 by Jean-Gaston Lalanne, a physician. It was carved into large block of limestone in a rock shelter (abri de Laussel) at the commune of Marquay in the Dordogne department of south-western France. The limestone block fell off the wall of the shelter. It was brought to the Musée d'Aquitaine in Bordeaux, France.

Meaning 
The figure and the horn are considered significant in figurative studies of Paleolithic art. There are many similarly formed "goddess figures", such as Venus of Willendorf, said to be of potential significance in Eurasian prehistoric religion. The color and the number of notches on the horn may symbolize the number of moons or the number of menstrual cycles in one year, or the number of days from menstruation to ovulation.

See also
Art of the Upper Paleolithic
List of Stone Age art

References

Further reading
 Eisler, Riane (1995), Sacred Pleasure: Sex, Myth, and the Politics of the Body, HarperCollins Publishers Inc., NY.

 Marshack, Alexander (1971). The Roots of Civilization, Moyer Bell Ltd, Mount Kisco, NY.

External links

 Pictures of the Venus of Laussel and further reliefs from Laussel

Gravettian
Stone sculptures in France
Dordogne
Prehistoric art in France
Archaeological discoveries in France
Limestone sculptures
Reliefs in France
1911 archaeological discoveries